Colmar Tropicale is a French-themed village and hotel located in Berjaya Hills Resort, Bukit Tinggi, Pahang, Malaysia. The development is inspired by the original town of Colmar in Alsace, France, with elements taken from ancient surrounding villages like Riquewihr, Turckheim and Kaysersberg as well.

Colmar Tropicale has many activities to do in the village, and it has a unique style. The little French buildings and houses are actually clusters of hotel rooms. Outside, there is the village, and a buffet, other authentic French restaurants, a swimming pool, shops and other activities. There is free shuttle service to the Animal House, Adventure Park, Horse Riding Zone, Japanese Garden and the Botanical Garden.

Berjaya Corporation Berhad 
Colmar Tropicale is developed by one of Malaysia's largest conglomerates Berjaya Corporations. The idea of this village came from when Malaysia's then-4th (later then-7th) Prime Minister, Tun Dato' Seri Dr. Mahathir Mohamad, was visiting a town called Colmar in Alsace, France and was captivated by the environment and aesthetics of the town. He later returned and convinced Tan Sri Dato' Seri. Vincent Tan Chee Yioun, the founder of Berjaya Corporations to develop this town as part of Mahathir's wishlist.

Hence, the Bukit Tinggi Resort Project was started. Now known as Berjaya Hills since its opening in 2000. Till today it is still in development as per a recent interview between Tan Sri. Vincent Tan and the New Straits Times, an estimated development value of RM 900 million is to be reached with the development of a further 3000 landed homes under Berjaya Hills. Stretching across  of highlands. He also said that this effort is made to spark development of a commercial centre at Berjaya Hills for more convivence for residents with the added help of the attraction of the Colmar Tropicale.

References

External links
Colmar Tropicale website

2000 establishments in Malaysia
Hotels in Pahang